Tuomo Iisakki Ruutu (born 16 February 1983) is a Finnish former professional ice hockey forward and current assistant coach with the Florida Panthers of the National Hockey League. Ruutu was drafted in the first round, ninth overall, at the 2001 NHL Entry Draft by the Chicago Blackhawks, the team he spent the first four seasons of his National Hockey League (NHL) career with, Ruutu has also played in the NHL for the Carolina Hurricanes and New Jersey Devils, before finishing his career with Davos of the Swiss National League (NL).

Ruutu is the younger brother of Jarkko Ruutu, a former ice hockey player, as well as Ottawa Senators European scout Mikko Ruutu.

Playing career
Ruutu started out playing for HIFK in the Finnish SM-liiga in the 1999–2000 season, and moved to Jokerit for the next two seasons. In 2002, he returned to HIFK for one more season. He was drafted by the Chicago Blackhawks in the 2001 NHL Entry Draft, as their first-round pick, ninth overall. He then moved to North America in 2003, playing a full 82 games with the Blackhawks in the 2003–04 season.

Ruutu did not play during the 2004–05 NHL lockout, opting to take the time to recover from injuries, but provided commentary on Finnish television during the 2005 IIHF World Championship, along with fellow Finnish NHLer Ville Nieminen. Ruutu returned to the NHL after the lockout but his 2005–06 season was cut short, first by a back injury that kept him out of the game for most of the fall, then by an ankle injury sustained in January that required season-ending surgery.

After an unimpressive showing at the 2006 IIHF World Championship, Ruutu contemplated retirement from playing professionally. However, this notion was put to rest when Ruutu signed a two-year, $3.75 million contract extension with Chicago on 13 September.

During the 2007–08 season, on 26 February 2008, at the NHL trade deadline, the Blackhawks traded Ruutu to the Carolina Hurricanes in exchange for Andrew Ladd. The Hurricanes promptly signed Ruutu to a one-year contract worth $2.25 million.

On 23 July 2009, the Hurricanes signed Ruutu to a three-year, $11.4 million contract extension, paying $3 million in 2009–10, $4 million in 2010–11 and $4.4 million in 2011–12.

On 22 February 2012, the Hurricanes signed Ruutu to a four-year contract extension worth $19 million. The deal paid Ruutu $4 million in 2012–13 and $5 million per year in the remaining years; it also included a no-trade clause for the first three years of the contract.

Just hours before the end of the NHL trade deadline on 5 March 2014, Ruutu was traded to the New Jersey Devils in exchange for centre Andrei Loktionov.

In the 2015–16 season, Ruutu could not stay healthy and tallied one assist in the final game of the season. Ruutu was not re-signed by the Devils once his contract expired, becoming an unrestricted free agent on 1 July 2016. After going through the summer unsigned, Ruutu agreed to a professional tryout with the Vancouver Canucks on 13 September.

On 11 October 2016, Canucks general manager Jim Benning announced Ruutu had been released from his PTO contract.

On 28 October 2016, Ruutu was signed by HC Davos for the remainder of the season as a replacement for the injured Daniel Rahimi. He made his NLA debut on 11 November 2016 and scored his first goal that same day in a 3–2 loss in Geneva against Genève-Servette HC.

International play

Ruutu represented Finland at the 2004 World Cup of Hockey and scored his first goal with the Finns in the final against Canada.

At the 2010 Winter Olympics in Vancouver, Ruutu won the bronze medal with Finland, and in 2011, he added a World Championship gold medal to his international resume. He has earned a medal in each of the 11 major international tournaments he has competed in.

Ruutu also played for Finland at the 2014 Winter Olympics in Sochi, as the Finns finished in third place, routing the United States 5–0 to claim bronze, with Ruutu recording an assist on Juuso Hietanen's goal.

Ruutu played for Finland again at the 2015 World Championships, where the Finns were eliminated at the quarterfinal against the Czech Republic, marking just the second time Ruutu did not win a medal from an international tournament he took part in, the other being the 2004 World Cup where there's nothing awarded to anyone other than the tournament winners.

Career statistics

Regular season and playoffs

International

Coaching career
Ruutu was hired as an assistant coach with the Florida Panthers on June 29, 2021. Prior to his hiring with Florida, Ruutu had spent two years as Assistant Director of Player Development with the New York Rangers.

See also
Notable families in the NHL
List of Olympic medalist families

References

External links
 

1983 births
Living people
Carolina Hurricanes players
Chicago Blackhawks draft picks
Chicago Blackhawks players
Finnish expatriate ice hockey players in the United States
Finnish ice hockey left wingers
HIFK (ice hockey) players
Ice hockey players at the 2010 Winter Olympics
Ice hockey players at the 2014 Winter Olympics
Jokerit players
Medalists at the 2010 Winter Olympics
Medalists at the 2014 Winter Olympics
National Hockey League first-round draft picks
New Jersey Devils players
Olympic bronze medalists for Finland
Olympic ice hockey players of Finland
Olympic medalists in ice hockey
Sportspeople from Vantaa
Finnish expatriate ice hockey players in Switzerland